Cell Mates may refer to:

 Cell Mates (album), a 1996 album by Bowling for Soup
 Cell Mates (play), a 1995 play by Simon Gray
 "Cell Mates" (song), a 2009 song by The Bronx

See also
 Cellmates, a 2011 American comedy film
 Prison cell